Forgive Me is the third extended play by South Korean singer BoA. It was released by SM Entertainment on November 22, 2022, and contains six tracks, including the lead single of the same name.

Background and release
On November 8, 2022, SM Entertainment announced BoA would be releasing her third extended play titled Forgive Me on November 22. Three days later, the promotional schedule was released with "Forgive Me" announced as the lead single. On November 21, the music video teaser for "Forgive Me" was released.

Composition
Forgive Me consists of six tracks. The lead single "Forgive Me" was described as a hip-hop dance song characterized by "strong electric guitar rhythm" with lyrics about "giving a blow to an opponent who is mistaken and presumptuous while trapped in their own twisted frame". The second track "Zip" was described as R&B dance song with lyrics that "contains a warning message about not leaving any mercy to a lover who caused an irreversible relationship". The third track "Sketch" was described as a new wave-based pop song with "90's synth pluck rhythm and funky guitar rhythm". The fourth track "Breathe" was described as a "hybrid" electronica song with lyrics about "the moment when we get close enough to feel each other’s breathing". The fifth track "After Midnight" was described as acoustic pop song featuring "warm melody of an acoustic guitar". The sixth track "Hope" was described as acoustic ballad song with lyrics that "expresses love and gratitude to family, lovers, and friends who always stand by your side in a tiring life".

Promotion
Prior to the release of Forgive Me, on November 22, 2022, BoA held a live event called "BoA 'Forgive Me' Countdown Live" on YouTube to introduce the EP and to communicate with her fans.

Track listing

Charts

Weekly charts

Monthly charts

Release history

References

BoA albums
2022 EPs
Korean-language EPs
SM Entertainment EPs